The Alliance for Peace and Democracy (APD) was a coalition of two Liberian political parties, the Liberian People's Party (LPP) and the United People's Party (UPP), that contested the 11 October 2005 elections.

APD candidate Togba-Nah Tipoteh won 2.3% of the vote in the presidential poll. The coalition won five seats in the Senate and three in the House of Representatives. 

Both parties campaigned as part of the National Democratic Coalition in the 2011 presidential and legislative elections.

Political party alliances in Liberia